National Highway 753L, commonly referred to as NH 753L is a national highway in  India. It is a spur road of National Highway 53. NH-753L traverses the states of Madhya Pradesh and Maharashtra in India.

Route 

Pahur, Jamner, Bodvad, Muktainagar, Burhanpur, deshgaon.

Junctions  

  Terminal near Pahur.
  Terminal near Khandwa.

See also 

 List of National Highways in India
 List of National Highways in India by state

References

External links 

 NH 753L on OpenStreetMap

National highways in India
National Highways in Maharashtra
National Highways in Madhya Pradesh